Boo is a 2005 American horror film directed by Anthony C. Ferrante.

Plot
Jessie Holden is invited by her boyfriend, Kevin, and two friends, Freddy and Marie, to spend one Halloween night at Santa Mira Hospital, abandoned years ago due to a fire. Their friend, Emmett, is preparing the props to scare Jessie when he and his dog, Dutchess, are attacked by a ghost. Meanwhile, Allan is searching for his sister, Meg, who went missing with her friend, Caitlin, in the hospital a few days ago. His father's old friend, former actor-turned-cop Arlo Ray Baines, initially refuses his plea to accompany him to the hospital, but changes his mind and trails him anyway. Allan finds Dutchess horribly mutilated, but she suddenly rises up and attacks him until he shoots and blows her to bits. Upon entering the third floor, he reunites with Meg, who says that she got separated from Caitlin.

Arriving at the hospital, the four friends begin searching for Emmett. When they are alone, Kevin cheats on Jessie by having sex with Marie. Meanwhile, Jessie, who is revealed to be spiritually aware, tells Freddy the story of her late mother, who died due to disease years ago but is still calling her every Halloween. The two stumble upon a terrified Emmett in the locker room. When the five meet up, Emmett suddenly begins attacking them. Allan and Meg arrive in time and Meg uses Allan's gun to shoot Emmett to bits. She tells the group that everyone who die in the hospital are reanimated; Emmett and Dutchess are among them. A paranoid Kevin, suspecting that Marie is becoming a ghost, grabs Allan's gun and shoots her dead.

Since Meg refuses to use the elevator, the group split up, with Jessie, Kevin, and Freddy taking Marie's body to the elevator and Allan and Meg using the stairs. The former three are transported to the third floor, where Jessie has a series of premonitions involving a child murderer named Jacob. Jacob was committed to the hospital's third floor that was specifically reserved for mental patients. Despite this, he managed to murder a little girl in the hospital's premises anyway. When he tried to run away by burning the hospital as distraction, Nurse Russell threw away the door keys, trapping both of them in the fire. Jacob has been killing and reanimating people in the hospital so he can possess them, but all have failed so far. While inspecting the floor, Kevin goes missing.

Jessie and Freddy reunite with Allan, Meg, and Arlo, who has killed a reanimated Caitlin and decided to save them all. They find Kevin trapped by the little girl's spirit and manage to free him, but in the process, Freddy is revealed to have died and was reanimated, forcing Arlo to shoot him. The rest try to escape through the stairs, however, Jessie eventually realizes that until they are able to beat Jacob, he will never allow them to leave. To do it, she impersonates Nurse Russell, intending to scare him from the living world. The plan works. Nevertheless, Jacob uses a reanimated Marie to kill Kevin. Kevin is reanimated, but shows no symptom of a normal ghost. It is revealed that he is directly possessed by Jacob, who finds Kevin, a sociopath, to be a perfect vessel. At the same time, Meg shows herself to be a reanimation; she had died alongside Caitlin back then. However, she is possessed by Russell and retains her control. Russell tells the group to leave while she confronts and successfully subdues Jacob.

Jessie, Allan, and Arlo leave the premises safely, finding out that it is already the noon of All Saint's Day outside. Back at the hospital, Jacob vows to escape, but Russell casually states that he will have to get through her first before turning off the lights.

Cast
Trish Coren as Jessie Holden
M. Steven Felty as Jacob
Jilon VanOver as Kevin
Nicole Rayburn as Marie
Josh Holt as Freddy
Michael Samluk as Allan
Rachel Melvin as Meg
Dig Wayne as Arlo Ray Baine/Dynamite Jones
Happy Mahaney as Emmett
Dee Wallace as Nurse Russell
Terri Novak as Jessie’s mom
Taylor Hurley as The Ghost Girl

References

External links 

 
 
 

2005 films
2005 horror films
American supernatural horror films
Halloween horror films
Films directed by Anthony C. Ferrante
Films set in abandoned houses
American ghost films
Films set in hospitals
2000s English-language films
2000s American films